This list of ichthyosaur type specimens is a list of fossils serving as the official standard-bearers for inclusion in the species and genera of the reptile clade Ichthyosauromorpha (Hupehsuchia included). Type specimens are those which are definitionally members of biological taxa and additional specimens can only be "referred" to these taxa if an expert deems them sufficiently similar to the type.

The list

See also 

 List of ichthyosaurs
 Timeline of ichthyosaur research

References 

Ichthyosaur
Type specimens